Vanguard Healthcare - properly Vanguard Healthcare Solutions Ltd. is a provider of mobile clinical facilities based in Gloucester.

The company was established in 1999 as part of Cardinal Healthcare in 1999. Cardinal Healthcare was acquired by InHealth Group in 2002 and the mobile service's management team left to create Vanguard Healthcare. In 2003 it had 6 mobile theatres and two wards in use, and in some cases provided staff as well as buildings.  The company was bought by Nuffield Health in 2004.  In April 2009 it again became an independent company following a management buyout backed by MML Capital Partners.  In 2014 it has 40 mobile surgical units and claims to be the single largest fleet of mobile surgical facilities in the world.  It operates across Europe and in Australia.   Mike Farrar was employed as a Strategic Advisor in March 2014.  The company made an “operating profit” of £1.6m in 2013/4 but the cost servicing loans from MML meant that it paid no corporation tax - and hasn't since 2009.

The company entered into a contract to perform cataract surgery for Taunton and Somerset NHS Foundation Trust in May 2014 using a mobile unit in a car park at Musgrove Park Hospital.  The contract was quickly stopped when patients came back to the Trust's casualty department with a high rate of complication following surgery. A report on the incident was released  on 16 October.  Vanguard chief executive Ian Gillespie said: "No issues have been identified with the Vanguard mobile theatre facility itself."  It was unclear who would be liable for any clinical negligence claims.  Colin Close, the trust's medical director, was quoted by the Somerset County Gazette saying: “Any financial responsibility would rest with us. If any patients wish to pursue compensation, we would work with them,”  but the Trust said Dr Close had been misquoted. According to the  Department of Health the NHS standard contract requires all contractors of NHS care “to hold and maintain adequate and appropriate indemnity insurance”.  Mr. Gillespie said that it “has appropriate cover in place”.

In 2021 the company provided  a dual-procedure endoscopy suite at Fairfield General Hospital with a laminar-flow theatre, two procedure rooms, a six-bed recovery bay and two consultation rooms, in a multi-room bespoke temporary modular building. It provides colonoscopy, sigmoidoscopy, and gastroscopy seven days a week for patients across Greater Manchester.

References

External links
 Vanguard Health

Private providers of NHS services
Companies based in Gloucester